High mobility group box 1 protein, also known as high-mobility group protein 1 (HMG-1) and amphoterin, is a protein that in humans is encoded by the HMGB1 gene.

HMG-1 belongs to the high mobility group and contains a HMG-box domain.

Function 
Like the histones, HMGB1 is among the most important  chromatin proteins. In the nucleus HMGB1 interacts with nucleosomes, transcription factors, and histones. This nuclear protein organizes the DNA and regulates transcription. After binding, HMGB1 bends DNA, which facilitates the binding of other proteins. HMGB1 supports transcription of many genes in interactions with many transcription factors. It also interacts with nucleosomes to loosen packed DNA and remodel the chromatin. Contact with core histones changes the structure of nucleosomes.

The presence of HMGB1 in the nucleus depends on posttranslational modifications. When the protein is not acetylated, it stays in the nucleus, but hyperacetylation on lysine residues causes it to translocate into the cytosol.

HMGB1 has been shown to play an important role in helping the RAG endonuclease form a paired complex during V(D)J recombination.

Role in inflammation 

HMGB1 is secreted by immune cells (like macrophages, monocytes and dendritic cells) through leaderless secretory pathway. Activated macrophages and monocytes secrete HMGB1 as a cytokine mediator of Inflammation. Antibodies that neutralize HMGB1 confer protection against damage and tissue injury during arthritis, colitis, ischemia, sepsis, endotoxemia, and systemic lupus erythematosus. The mechanism of inflammation and damage consists of binding to TLR2 and TLR4, which mediates HMGB1-dependent activation of macrophage cytokine release.  This positions HMGB1 at the intersection of sterile and infectious inflammatory responses.

ADP-ribosylation of HMGB1 by PARP1 inhibits removal of apoptotic cells, thereby sustaining inflammation.  TLR4 binding by HMGB1 or LPS (lipopolysaccharide) sustains ADP-ribosylation of HMGB1 by PARP1 thereby serving as an amplification loop for inflammation.

HMGB1 has been proposed as a DNA vaccine adjuvant. HMGB1 released from tumour cells was demonstrated to mediate anti-tumour immune responses by activating Toll-like receptor 2 (TLR2) signaling on bone marrow-derived GBM-infiltrating DCs.

Interactions 

HMGB1 has to interact with p53.

HMGB1 is a nuclear protein that binds to DNA and acts as an architectural chromatin-binding factor. It can also be released from cells, in which extracellular form it can bind the inflammatory receptor RAGE (Receptor for Advanced Glycation End-products) and Toll-like receptors (TLRs). Release from cells seems to involve two distinct processes: necrosis, in which case cell membranes are permeabilized and intracellular constituents may diffuse out of the cell; and some form of active or facilitated secretion induced by signaling through the NF-κB. HMGB1 also translocates to the cytosol under stressful conditions such as increased ROS inside the cells. Under such conditions, HMGB1 promotes cell survival by sustaining autophagy through interactions with beclin-1. It is largely considered as an antiapoptotic protein.

HMGB1 can interact with TLR ligands and cytokines, and activates cells through the multiple surface receptors including TLR2, TLR4, and RAGE.

Interaction via TLR4 

Some actions of HMGB1 are mediated through the toll-like receptors (TLRs). Interaction between HMGB1 and TLR4 results in upregulation of NF-κB, which leads to increased production and release of cytokines. HMGB1 is also able to interact with TLR4 on neutrophils to stimulate the production of reactive oxygen species by NADPH oxidase. HMGB1-LPS complex activates TLR4, and causes the binding of adapter proteins (MyD88 and others), leading to signal transduction and the activation of various signaling cascades. The downstream effect of this signaling is to activate MAPK and NF-κB, and thus cause the production of inflammatory molecules such as cytokines.

Clinical significance 

HMGB1 has been proposed as a target for cancer therapy, as a vector for reducing inflammation from SARS-CoV-2 infection.  and as a biomarker for post-COVID-19 condition. 

The neurodegenerative disease spinocerebellar ataxia type 1 (SCA1) is caused by mutation in the ataxin 1 gene.  In a mouse model of SCA1, mutant ataxin 1 protein mediated the reduction or inhibition of HMGB1 in the mitochondria of neurons.  HMGB1 regulates DNA architectural changes essential for repair of DNA damage.  In the SCA1 mouse model, over-expression of the HMGB1 protein by means of an introduced virus vector bearing the HMGB1 gene facilitated repair of the mitochondrial DNA damage, ameliorated the neuropathology and the motor defects of the SCA1 mice, and also extended their lifespan.  Thus impairment of HMGB1 function appears to have a key role in the pathogenesis of SCA1.

Recently, a study provided evidence of an association between raised levels of HMGB1 and attention to detail and systemizing in unmedicated children with high-functioning Autism spectrum disorder (ASD), suggesting that inflammatory processes mediated by HMGB1 may play a role in the disruption of neurobiological mechanisms regulating cognitive processes in ASD. In this study, HMGB1 serum concentrations in children with ASD were found significantly higher than those of typically developing children. Additionally, HMGB1 serum concentrations were positively correlated with the Autistic quotient (AQ) attention to detail score and the Systemizing Quotient (SQ) total score in the ASD group. However, comprehensive evidence in children is limited, highlighting the need for in-depth research towards understanding possible mechanisms linking HMGB1 with the core features of ASD. Nevertheless, it has been suggested that HMGB1 could be a reliable inflammatory marker, explaining the link between inflammatory processes and several autistic traits, and therefore a possible therapeutic target in this neurodevelopmental disorder.

References

Further reading

External links 
 
 Pancreatic Cancer Research and HMGB1 Signaling Pathway
 PDBe-KB provides an overview of all the structure information available in the PDB for Human High mobility group protein B1 (HMGB1)
  PDBe-KB provides an overview of all the structure information available in the PDB for Rat High mobility group protein B1 (HMGB1)

Transcription factors